Catavi (from Aymara Q'atawi, meaning "lime") is a small town in Bolivia. In 2009 it had an estimated population of 814.

References

Populated places in La Paz Department (Bolivia)